Soriano Calabro is a comune (municipality) in the Province of Vibo Valentia in the Italian region Calabria, located about  southwest of Catanzaro and about  southeast of Vibo Valentia.

Soriano Calabro was founded by a group of monks composed mostly of Syrians and also Egyptians who migrated to the Italian peninsula in the 10th century. The monks were permitted to settle in three different places, in Lazio, Sicily and Calabria. Those who settled in Calabria founded the town of Soriano Calabro, originally naming it Soriano, which was taken from the name of the country Syria (سوريا sūryā in Arabic) and hence meant 'Syrian', which at that time in Italian was written as 'Sòriano'.

In 1510, Dominican brothers founded a friary at Soriano Calabro. From 1530, and for at least about 130 years, their most precious possession was the miraculous portrait of Saint Dominic in Soriano.

Soriano Calabro borders the following municipalities: Gerocarne, Pizzoni, Sorianello, Stefanaconi.

References

Cities and towns in Calabria
Populated places established in the 10th century
Municipalities of the Province of Vibo Valentia